Billy Pauch (born March 1, 1957, in Doylestown, Pennsylvania, U.S.) is an American racecar driver. He resides in Frenchtown, New Jersey, where he runs the Bill Pauch Driving School.

Pauch attended Hunterdon Central Regional High School, which was located near the Flemington Speedway.

Career

Known for racing Modifieds, dirt small-block and big-block Modifieds, and dirt sprint cars throughout the eastern United States, Pauch had over 600 career feature wins. Pauch was the 1999, 2000, 2002, 2008, 2011, and 2013 New Egypt Speedway Modified division champion claiming over 100 wins at the track (the second place only has 29), among many other track championships.  Pauch has also made four NASCAR Craftsman Truck Series starts, with his best finish coming in 1998 at Flemington Speedway where he finished in sixth place in the No. 06 Dick Greenfield Dodge.  In 1988, Pauch won 42 feature races and earned three track championships. He is still racing in weekly races in New Jersey as of June 2020.

His son Billy Pauch Jr. raced the full schedule of the Whelen Modified Tour in 2007.

Motorsports career results

NASCAR
(key) (Bold – Pole position awarded by qualifying time. Italics – Pole position earned by points standings or practice time. * – Most laps led.)

Craftsman Truck Series

Winston Modified Tour

References

External links
 

NASCAR drivers
1957 births
Living people
People from Frenchtown, New Jersey
Racing drivers from New Jersey
Racing drivers from Pennsylvania
Sportspeople from Hunterdon County, New Jersey
World of Outlaws drivers